Kirk Baptiste (June 20, 1962 – March 24, 2022) was an American track and field athlete, who mainly competed in the 200 metres. He was born in Beaumont, Texas. He competed for the United States at the 1984 Summer Olympics held in Los Angeles, United States, where he won the silver medal in the 200 metres with a time of 19.96 seconds. This was the first time anyone had broken 20 seconds and come second in the race. He decided to forgo his final season of eligibility at the University of Houston after his successful junior year. Baptiste was diagnosed with HIV in the 1990s, spending a decade abusing drugs to escape. In 2006 he began treatment at "A Caring Safe Place" in Houston.

References

External links
 
 
 

1962 births
2022 deaths
American male sprinters
Olympic silver medalists for the United States in track and field
Athletes (track and field) at the 1984 Summer Olympics
Sportspeople from Beaumont, Texas
Track and field athletes from Texas
People with HIV/AIDS
Houston Cougars men's track and field athletes
Medalists at the 1984 Summer Olympics
USA Outdoor Track and Field Championships winners
World Athletics Indoor Championships winners